Gambyapur is a village in Dharwad district of Karnataka, India.

Demographics 
As of the 2011 Census of India there were 502 households in Gambyapur and a total population of 2,588 consisting of 1,322 males and 1,266 females. There were 373 children ages 0-6.

References

Villages in Dharwad district